Alice Shoal (Spanish: Banco Alicia or Bajo Alicia) is a wholly submerged reef, located in the western Caribbean Sea, about  southwest of Jamaica.

Alice Shoal is situated 31 km northeast of East Cay of Serranilla Bank, and 48 km west of Bajo Nuevo Bank. The bank is about 16 km in diameter as defined by the 200 m isobath, which corresponds to an area of more than 200 km2. There are no islets, cays or above-water rocks. The bottom is fine white sand. Rip currents mark the edges of the bank.

The reef falls within the Joint Regime Area of Colombia and Jamaica, a maritime delimitation zone which allows for co-operative control and exploitation of resources between the two states.

References

External links
  — satellite images.

Geography of Colombia
Undersea banks of the Caribbean Sea
Geography of the Archipelago of San Andrés, Providencia and Santa Catalina